Philip Oakey & Giorgio Moroder is a 1985 collaborative studio album by English singer Philip Oakey, the lead singer of the Human League, and Italian record producer Giorgio Moroder. It peaked at number 52 on the UK Albums Chart.

The album includes "Together in Electric Dreams", which was originally written for the 1984 film Electric Dreams. The track peaked at number 3 on the UK Singles Chart. "Good-Bye Bad Times" peaked at number 44 and "Be My Lover Now" peaked at number 91 on the UK Singles Chart.

Production
In 2003, in an interview by Simon Price included on the DVD The Very Best of The Human League, Oakey was asked to comment on the experience of working with his idol Moroder on this project. He diplomatically characterises him as a "very quick worker", claiming they made the entire album in a few days.

Track listing

Personnel
Credits adapted from liner notes.

 Philip Oakey – vocals
 Giorgio Moroder – production, synthesizer
 Arthur Barrow – synthesizer, drum programming, bass guitar
 Richie Zito – guitar
 Joe Esposito – background vocals
 Elizabeth Daily – background vocals

Charts

References

External links
 
 

1985 albums
Collaborative albums
Philip Oakey albums
Giorgio Moroder albums
Virgin Records albums
Albums produced by Giorgio Moroder
The Human League